Metarealism is a direction in Russian poetry and art that was born in the 1970s to the 1980s. The term was first used by Mikhail Epshtein, who coined it in 1981 and made it public in the Soviet magazine "Voprosy Literatury" in 1983

M. Epshtein insists that in its philosophic dimension metarealism is "metaphysical realism," while "stylistically" metarealism is "metaphorical" realism. Thus, "meta" means both "through" and "beyond" the reality that we all can see; hence, "metarealism" is the realism of the hyperphysical nature of things. The main expression of its essence is given through a non-visual metaphor or, according to another Epshtein's term, a "metabola" (rather than hyperbole), that means "transfer" or "transition," opening many dimensions. "Metabola" is different from the symbol or a "visual" metaphor, because it assumes the interosculation of realities. Metarealism has little to do with surrealism, since it appeals to the superconscious and not to the subconscious, thus opening up a many-dimensional perception of the world.

Metarealism further gained traction after it became a subject of the House of Artists debate at an exhibition of the Hyperrealists, where its utility was discussed as a new method of creation to overcome traditional realism.

What is metarealism?

Metarealism is synonymous to metaconscience, which means beyond psychological consciousness, beyond a subjective psychological polarized view of reality. Metarealism seeks to depict the reality which exists beyond that psychological subjective perspective. Metarealism proposes not only to communicate further than the pictorial aspect of the perception of other dimensions of reality, but also the essence of those dimensions and their relation to us as human beings. Metarealism then becomes a tool for the evolution of consciousness; just like in the old days when artists painted sacred art to depict their vision of the reality they perceived, through their spiritual interpretation of other dimensions. Thus, Epstein explained that the entire history of world art is the premise and source of metarealism, particularly its condensed codes, encyclopedic summaries, and extracts. For instance, metabola or metabole is derived from the dictionary and a microencyclopedia of culture, compressed and translated from one language to another so that it pertains to a reality consisted of interpenetration of different consubstantial realities. For Epstein, metarealism is an attempt to return to the word the fullness of its figurative and transcendent meanings.

Metarealism could be also considered a sacred art, in that it also tries to depict, through a [metaconscious] perspective, the essence of reality as perceived by a metaconscious mind. Meta meaning, a holistic view of reality as perceived by a metaconscious mind, who sees reality as a whole rather than from a subjective personalized intellectually fragmented point of view. Metarealism is the materialization in pictorial form of the reality of other dimensions and their direct effect, and relation upon us. Metarealism tries to depict the relations between those dimensions of reality and how we psychologically interpret them through our sub mental symbolism. As a narrative style, metarealism does not have a clearly defined lyrical hero and focuses instead on the so-called sum of perceptions, which is "the geometrical space constituted by points of view.

Metarealism in visual art

According to Bernard De Montréal, most contemporary visual arts are involutionary art that expresses the dissimulated frustrations and struggle of the unconscious self in her search for real identity through the euphoric, sub mental symbolism of the art form an avocation of the soul that has little in common with the interdimensional identity of the self.

Conscious or mental art "metarealism" when created by a metaconscious artist is inspired by the higher self and is a channel for the dictation of the conscious science of art, instead of being simply a lower form of self-expression, a cultural artifact of relative value.

The mental artist has little need for unconscious expression and directs her creative "expiration" toward the exploration of higher consciousness through her art, rather than simply entertaining a fictitious role. Art in its astral form belongs to our kind of civilization. We still need its contention that there is more to reality than appears at first sight. Art in its higher form is therefore created by a totally new human being.

References

External links
 Mikhail Epstein: A Catalogue of the New Poetries
 Mikhail Epshtein: Theses on Metarealism and Conceptualism
 Marjorie Perloff "Russian Postmodernism: An Oxymoron?" in Postmodern Culture, Volume 3, # 2, January 1993
 On Russian Meta-Realist Poetry: A Conversation with Ilya Kutik - article by Reginal Gibbons
 On Rhyme - article by Reginald Gibbons
 Tomas Epstein: Dictionary of Russian Literature
 What is metarealism? - article by Vika Bregeda
 Словарь литературных терминов/Dictionary of the Literary Terms
 Encyclopædia Britannica
 Lyn Hejinian and Russian Estrangement by Jacob Edmond, p. 13-111
 Englishing Metarealism by Patrick Henry, UofCA, Berkeley
 Владимир Аристов. Заметки о "Мета". For its English translation, see: Re-entering the sign : articulating new Russian culture by Ellen E Berry;  Anesa Miller-Pogacar. Ann Arbor : University of Michigan Press, 1995 
 Metarealism in art - its roots in the works of Giorgio de Chirico
 20th Century painters of Metarealism
 About Russian metarealism - Interview with D. Dragilew, in German
 Metarealism
 Metarealism - article by Charles Sabourin, who quotes from the "Theses on Metarealism" by M.Epshtein
 Article by Charles Sabourin about Bernard De Montréal
 Severskaia O.I. IAzyk poeticheskoi shkoly: idiolekt, idiostil', sotsiolekt. (Language of Poetic School: Idiolect, Idiostyle, Sociolect) M.: Slovari.ru; Institut russkogo iazyka im. V.V.Vinogradova RAN, 2007. 126 p. Soft. . 500 copies.  In Russian. The offered edition reflects the experience of language description of one of leading schools of the modern Russian poetry, metarealism, as a “social dialect” of poetic language. Poetics of I.Zhdanov, A.Parshchikov, A.Dragomoshchenko, S.Soloviev, V.Aristov, I.Kutik, E.Dayenin is considered in comparison with Russian conceptual and ironic poetry, and also with poetic principles of some foreign authors. The reader is able to get an idea about a peculiar “philosophy of language” of metarealists, constants of their poetic world, metametaphor, “poetic theater” and other things.

Russian poetry
Art movements
Modern art
Literary realism